Kenneth E. Stager (January 28, 1915 in Uniontown, Pennsylvania – May 13, 2009 in West Los Angeles) was an American ornithologist who served as a curator at the Natural History Museum of Los Angeles County.

Clipperton Island
In 1958, Stager visited Clipperton Island and saw that the breeding colonies of brown boobies and masked boobies were being devastated by feral pigs that had been introduced to the island by earlier travelers. To protect the booby populations, Stager personally shot and killed every pig on the island, for a total of 58; the booby populations subsequently recovered.

However, according to author J. M. Skaggs, Stager's expedition arrived outside the nesting season, and apparently did not take into account the seasonal variations in seabird populations present on the island. With no personal experience or scientific measurements, they relied merely upon earlier, non-scientific accounts citing "millions of birds" and the current paucity of resident specimens to arrive at the opinion that the bird population had been devastated by the feral pigs. Without the pigs to keep them in check, land crab (Johngarthia planata) populations surged, devastating the island's vegetation.

Stager's actions served to inspire the ecological group Island Conservation, which focuses on removing introduced species from islands.

References

1915 births
2009 deaths
American ornithologists
United States Army personnel of World War II
University of California, Los Angeles alumni
20th-century American zoologists